The Sigma 24-35mm F2 DG HSM Art is an interchangeable camera lens announced by Sigma Corporation on June 19, 2015.

References
http://www.dpreview.com/products/sigma/lenses/sigma_24-35_2/specifications

024-035mm F2 DG HSM Art
Camera lenses introduced in 2015